The 2006–07 Royal League fixtures and results.

Rules
The twelve participating teams are placed into three groups of four clubs each. The teams of each group face each other home and away. The group winners and runners-up qualify for the quarter-finals, along with the two best third placed teams. As opposed to the previous edition of the tournament, the knock-out stages are played as single legs. In the quarter-final draw, teams from the same group or the same country are, as far as possible, not paired together.

Bonuses
Prize money for the tournament are paid like this:
Qualification for the tournament itself: 1,000,000 DKK
Qualification for the quarter finals,
through the first place of the group: 600,000 DKK
through the second place of the group: 300,000 DKK
through the third place of the group: 150,000 DKK (no bonus is given for third-place finishers that do not qualify)
Match bonuses
Group phase victory: 125,000 DKK
Group phase draw: 62,500 DKK
Quarter-final victory: 350,000 DKK
Semi-final victory: 400,000 DKK
Final victory (Royal League champion): 2,000,000 DKK
Final loss (Royal League runner-up): 500,000 DKK

Spectator bonuses
Another potential 8 million DKK are up for grabs through two separate spectator bonuses:

Bonus no. 1 pays a maximum of 6.3 million DKK total, based on the average home attendance in the Royal League compared against the clubs' average attendance in their respective league:
An average of more than 60% pays 525,000 DKK
More than 55% pays 450,000 DKK
More than 50% pays 375,000 DKK
More than 45% pays 225,000 DKK
More than 40% pays 150,000 DKK
More than 35% pays 75,000 DKK

Bonus no. 2 distributes 1.7 million DKK between clubs in relation to a club's average home attendance in the Royal League. A certain average gives a certain amount of shares:
An average of more than 5,000 spectators gives the club 4 shares out of the 1.7 million total
More than 6,000 spectators gives 8 shares
More than 7,000 spectators gives 12 shares
More than 8,000 spectators gives 16 shares
More than 9,000 spectators gives 20 shares
More than 10,000 spectators gives 24 shares
After the tournament, the money will be distributed in relation to how many shares the different clubs have.

Group stage

The group stage started the week following the last day of the Norwegian and Swedish championships (5 November), and was scheduled to end 10 December. However, some group matches were moved to February due to the participation of FC Copenhagen in UEFA Champions League, and that of Odense BK in the UEFA Cup.

Tiebreakers, if necessary, are applied in the following order:
Goal difference in all group matches.
Goals scored in all group matches.
Goals scored in all away group matches.
Draw.

Group 1

Group 2

Group 3

3rd placed teams

Knockout stage

Quarter-finals

Semi-finals

Final

Top scorers

See also
 2006–07 Royal League statistics

References

External links
 Official site

 
2006–07
 
2006–07 in Danish football
2006 in Swedish football
2007 in Swedish football
2006 in Norwegian football
2007 in Norwegian football